Maria Krista Aguilar (born April 8, 1988), known professionally as Rufa Mi, is a Filipina comedian, presenter, actress, and singer. Rufa Mi is known for impersonating actress Rufa Mae Quinto.

Career
Rufa Mi began as a band singer, joining contests before entering Philippine show business. Rufa Mi auditioned for Pinoy Pop Superstar twice but failed, later entering an impersonation contest and dance audition for the EB Babes dance troupe in Eat Bulaga! but still did not win. One of the EB Babes judges, Andrew de Real, gave her a chance to perform at The Library, a known comedy bar. Since then, Joey de Leon gave her the stage name "Rufa Mi" because she bears a resemblance Rufa Mae Quinto.

Television commitments aside, Rufa Mi currently performs at The Library every Friday.

Filmography

Television

Film

References

External links

Rufa Mi on The Library

1988 births
Living people
Filipino women comedians
Filipino television actresses
Star Magic
The Voice of the Philippines contestants
Lyceum of the Philippines University alumni